Plattenburg is a municipality in the Prignitz district, in Brandenburg, Germany. It is named after the water castle of Plattenburg which is located in the district.

Demography

References

Localities in Prignitz